is a Japanese former footballer who played as a midfielder.

Career statistics

Club
.

References

1992 births
Living people
Japanese footballers
Japanese expatriate footballers
Association football midfielders
Latvian Higher League players
Liga I players
JEF United Chiba players
Pogoń Szczecin players
Ilūkstes NSS players
CS Gaz Metan Mediaș players
Japanese expatriate sportspeople in Poland
Expatriate footballers in Poland
Japanese expatriate sportspeople in Latvia
Expatriate footballers in Latvia
Japanese expatriate sportspeople in Romania
Expatriate footballers in Romania
People from Ichihara, Chiba